Henry Bathurst (16 October 1744 – 5 April 1837) was an English churchman, a prominent Whig and bishop of Norwich.

Life
He was the seventh son of Benjamin Bathurst, younger brother of Allen Bathurst, 1st Earl Bathurst, born at Brackley, Northamptonshire, on 16 October 1744. He was educated at Winchester College, and New College, Oxford. He became rector of Witchingham in Norfolk; in 1775 was made canon of Christ Church, Oxford; and in 1795 prebendary of Durham Cathedral.

In 1805, on the translation of Charles Manners-Sutton to Canterbury, he was consecrated bishop of Norwich. Bathurst died in London, on 5 April 1837, and was buried at Great Malvern. For many years he was considered to be the only "liberal" bishop in the House of Lords, and he supported Catholic emancipation. Bathurst was privately critical of the blood expended by the British in fighting Napoleon and in 1815 he and his son (just appointed his archdeacon at Norwich) attacked the restoration of the Bourbon dynasty in France. Like his Norfolk friend Thomas W Coke ("Coke of Holkham") he admired Napoleon as an enlightened ruler and regretted his exile. In 1835, when over ninety years of age, he went to the house to vote in support of Lord Melbourne's government.

Although frequently considered to have been a rather ineffectual diocesan and to have had a lax ordination standard, ordaining men rejected by other bishops, recent work has suggested that he had firm opinions on what made a man fit for ordination and preferred to deal with applications on a case-by-case basis, instead of applying blanket admission criteria which sometimes excluded deserving and promising candidates.

Family
The bishop married Grace, a daughter of Charles Coote, dean of Kilfenora, and brother of Sir Eyre Coote. The union produced eight sons and three daughters.  His eldest son, Henry Bathurst, was a fellow of New College, Oxford, became chancellor of the church of Norwich in 1805; held the rectories of Oby (1806), North Creake (1809), and Hollesley (1828); and was appointed archdeacon of Norwich in 1814. He wrote Memoirs of the late Dr. Henry Bathurst, Lord Bishop of Norwich, 1837; he issued in 1842 a supplement, with additional letters of his father, entitled An Easter Offering for the Whigs . . . being a Supplement to the Memoirs of the late Bishop of Norwich, 1842, in which he concentrated criticism on the injustice of the Whig party in refusing to promote his father to a richer see. Archdeacon Bathurst died on 10 September 1844.

His second son, Lieut.-Gen. Sir James Bathurst, was a military commander. The bishop's third son, Benjamin Bathurst went missing in 1809 in Germany, and is believed to have been murdered; his elder daughter, Tryphena Bathurst Thistlethwayte, rewrote her father's memoirs from her eldest brother's papers. His youngest daughter Caroline de Crespigny (1797-1861) was a poet and for many years a close confidante of Shelley's cousin and biographer Thomas Medwin.

References

Attribution

1744 births
1837 deaths
Bishops of Norwich
Henry
Alumni of New College, Oxford
19th-century Church of England bishops